Pro Deo may refer to:
 a freeware chess engine; see REBEL (chess)
 A collection of poems and sonnets by Luis G. Dato.
 a Latin phrase meaning "for God", used in the Netherlands to describe voluntarily professional work, like Pro bono

Latin legal terminology